Laid Belhamel (born November 12, 1977 in El Eulma, Algeria) is a former Algerian football player.

National team statistics

External links
 

1977 births
Algerian footballers
Living people
Algeria international footballers
Algerian expatriate footballers
CR Belouizdad players
ES Sétif players
CS Constantine players
CA Bordj Bou Arréridj players
Expatriate footballers in Tunisia
Algerian expatriate sportspeople in Tunisia
People from El Eulma
MC El Eulma players
EGS Gafsa players
Algeria under-23 international footballers
Association football midfielders
21st-century Algerian people